Paprides is a genus of short-horned grasshoppers in the family Acrididae. There are at least two described species in Paprides, found in New Zealand.

Species
These species belong to the genus Paprides:
 Paprides dugdali Bigelow, 1967
 Paprides nitidus Hutton, 1898

References

External links

 

Acrididae